Amis is a surname. Notable people with the surname include:

B. D. Amis, American labor and civil rights leader
John Amis (1922–2013), British music critic and broadcaster
Kenneth Amis, composer and tuba player
Kingsley Amis, British novelist
Martin Amis, British novelist, son of Kingsley
Rufus Travis Amis, American entrepreneur
Stanley Amis (1924–2021), British architect
Stephen Amis, Australian film producer and director, cousin of Martin
Suzy Amis, American actress and model